Newhaven Lifeboat Station is an RNLI station located in the town of Newhaven in the English county of East Sussex in the United Kingdom. The station currently operates as all-weather lifeboat station. The original station was established in 1803 and taken over by the RNLI in 1854. The current lifeboat (2014) is the Severn class David and Elizabeth Acland (ON 1243).

Location 
Newhaven lifeboat station is situated on the west bank of the River Ouse within the Port of Newhaven which is one of only two navigable harbours between the Isle of Wight to the west and Dover to the east. The Port of Newhaven is a busy commercial port and a ferry terminal. The harbour opens out on to the English Channel, one of the busiest stretches of waterway in the world.

History 
Newhaven’s first lifeboat was established in 1803 when a lifeboat which had been built to a design by Henry Greathead, the pioneering rescue lifeboat builder from South Shields, was placed on station in the town. The lifeboat was funded partly by a donation from Lloyd's of London, and the rest from locally raised donations. The lifeboat was one of 31 of this type of lifeboat built by Greathead from his design of 1789 known as the Original. This type of lifeboat was designed to work in the shallow waters off the east coast of England but in small and open harbours like Newhaven, the Greathead-class were not popular because of their weight and the large number of crew needed to man the boat. Evidently this was the case at Newhaven and the lifeboat was not liked or trusted by the local volunteer lifeboat crew, and it was never launched to a service. In 1809 the Greathead-class was taken from the station and sent to Brighton.

In 1825 the forerunner of the RNLI, the National Institution for the Preservation of Life from Shipwreck supplied a lifeboat to the town. There was still no boathouse in the town and so this lifeboat when not in use was stored out in the open under a tarpaulin. This boat was on service at the town until 1829.

In 1852 Newhaven was provided with a lifeboat from the Shipwrecked Fishermen and Mariners Royal Benevolent Society.

A boathouse was constructed in 1867 to house the RNLI’s first lifeboat, RNLB Thomas Chapman, which had replaced RNLB The Friend in Need in 1863. In 1909 a new lifeboat house and slipway were constructed on the east bank of the River Ouse.

Fleet

Neighbouring Station Locations

See also
Royal National Lifeboat Institution
List of RNLI stations

References 

Lifeboat stations in East Sussex